Vulimiri Ramalingaswami (8 August 1921 – 28 May 2001) was an Indian medical scientist, pathologist and medical writer. His pioneering research on nutrition got him elected to the National Academy of Sciences, Russian Academy of Medical Sciences and the Royal Society of London.

He was also the director of All India Institute of Medical Sciences and later on director general of Indian Council of Medical Research and President of the Indian National Science Academy.  He was regarded a teacher of international repute in the areas of nutritional deficiency. He has been honoured with Shanti Swarup Bhatnagar Award. by Council of Scientific and Industrial Research in 1967 and Padma Shri in 1969, Padma Bhushan and Padma Vibhushan by Government of India, KK Birla National Award, and Basanti Devi Amirchand Prize (ICMR) in 1966. Leon Bernard Foundation Award was presented to him by Sir Harold Walter, president of the 1976 World Health Assembly.

Early life
He was born in a Telugu speaking family in Srikakulam, Andhra Pradesh to V. Gumpaswami and V. Sundaramma. His father was a government servant. He received his medical education from Andhra Medical College, Visakhapatnam and then went on a scholarship to Oxford.

He became the Director of the All India Institute of medical sciences(AIIMS). and served the premier institute for 10 years 1969–1979). He became the Director General of Indian Council of Medical Research, New Delhi. In remembrance of his great service, the Indian Government has decided to name the Indian Council of Medical Research building after him (Ramalingaswami Bhavan). He was also President of the Indian National Science Academy. He was Special Advisor to World Health Organization and President of National Institute of Immunology.

He has served as Chair of the International Task Force on Health Research for Development in Geneva (1990–93). He was Secretary-General of the International Conference on Nutrition, in Rome in December 1992. He was appointed to the Board of Governors of the International Development Research Centre (IDRC), Canada in 1999.

Fellowships
Indian Academy of Sciences.
Indian National Science Academy.
National Academy of Medical Sciences.
National Academy of Sciences, USA7.
Royal College of Pathologists (London), UK.
Royal College of Physicians, UK.
Russian Academy of Medical Sciences
Royal Society of London, March 1986

Selected publications

Ramalingaswami, V., Sriramachari, S., and Patwardhan, V. N., Ind. J. Med. Sci., 8, 433 (1954).

V. Ramalingaswami, Prevention of Micronutrient Deficiencies: Tools for Policymakers and Public Health Workers, The National Academies Press (1998).
V. Ramalingaswami, The Public health imperative of permanent elimination of iodine deficiency, 2000.

References

External links
Obituary
https://www.cdc.gov/ncidod/eid/vol7no3_supp/memoriam.html

http://www.india.gov.in/myindia/images/ps_awards.pdf

1921 births
2001 deaths
20th-century Indian medical doctors
Indian pathologists
Scientists from Andhra Pradesh
Indian nutritionists
Telugu people
Fellows of the Royal Society
Academic staff of the All India Institute of Medical Sciences, New Delhi
Foreign associates of the National Academy of Sciences
Indian medical administrators
Recipients of the Padma Bhushan in medicine
Recipients of the Padma Shri in medicine
People from Srikakulam
20th-century Indian biologists
People from Uttarandhra
Recipients of the Shanti Swarup Bhatnagar Award in Medical Science
Indian Council of Medical Research
Directors of the All India Institute of Medical Sciences, New Delhi
Léon Bernard Foundation Prize laureates